Turkey entered the Eurovision Song Contest 1992 with the song "Yaz Bitti" by Aylin Vatankoş after it won the Turkish national final. The song was composed by Aldoğan Şimşekyay and Aylin Uçanlar.

Before Eurovision

16. Eurovision Şarkı Yarışması Türkiye Finali 
The Turkish broadcaster, Türkiye Radyo ve Televizyon Kurumu (TRT), held a national final to select the Turkish representative for the Eurovision Song Contest 1992, held in Malmö, Sweden. 

The final took place on 21 March 1992 at the TRT Studios in Ankara, hosted by Nevin Agiç and Bülend Özveren. Thirteen songs competed and the winner was determined by the votes of eight regional juries.

At Eurovision
Vatankoş performed 4th on the night of the contest, following Israel and preceding Greece. "Yaz Bitti" came 19th in the contest with 17 points.

Voting

References

External links
Turkish National Final 1992

1992
Countries in the Eurovision Song Contest 1992
Eurovision